The AIA Tower is a skyscraper located in the North Point area of Hong Kong near Fortress Hill station. It was named after American International Assurance, a former member of American International Group, which occupies 12 floors of the building.

Overview

Location
AIA Tower is located at No. 183 Electric Road, at the corner with Oil Street, in the Fortress Hill area of North Point, in the Eastern District of Hong Kong. It stands across Oil Street from the former clubhouse of the Royal Hong Kong Yacht Club.

Features
The building was completed in 1999. It was designed by P & T Architects & Engineers Ltd. and Andrew Lee King Fun & Associates, and was developed by Henderson Land Development. The AIA Tower is composed entirely of commercial office space, and is an example of modern architecture. The tower has an in-house swimming pool and fitness centre.

Tenants
 AIA Wealth Select Centre, 12/F
 Glory Sky Group, 13/F
 University of Hong Kong School of Professional and Continuing Education (HKU SPACE), AIA Tower Learning Centre, 15/F & 18/F, removal in November 2015
 Abbott Laboratories, 20/F-21/F
 Henderson Land Development Office, 9/F, 14/F
 ROCCO Design Architects Limited, 38/F

See also
 AIA Central
 List of tallest buildings in Hong Kong

References

External links

 Floor plans on Henderson Land Development website

Skyscraper office buildings in Hong Kong
Fortress Hill
Buildings and structures completed in 1999
American International Group
1999 establishments in Hong Kong